Dongying, a prefecture-level city, lies on the northern (Bohai Sea) coast of Shandong province, People's Republic of China. Dongying is home to the Shengli Oilfield which after the Daqing oilfield is the second largest oilfield in China.

Administration

The prefecture-level city of Dongying administers five county-level divisions, including three districts and two counties:

Dongying District
Hekou District
Kenli District
Guangrao County
Lijin County

These are further divided into 43 township-level divisions, including 23 towns, 13 townships and seven subdistricts.

History

The city was established in 1983, as a base for developing the Yellow River Delta and China's second largest oilfield, Shengli Field. The oilfield was discovered in 1964 near a small village called Dongying, which gave its name to the city.

Geography

Dongying is located on the banks of the Yellow River Delta of Northern Shandong Province. Bordering prefectures are: 
Binzhou to the west 
Zibo to the southwest
Weifang to the south
The city's  coastline borders Laizhou Bay and Bohai Bay to the east and north respectively.

Climate
Dongying has a monsoon-influenced, four-season humid continental climate Köppen Dwa), with hot, humid summers, and cold but dry winters. The city is dry and nearly rainless in spring, hot and rainy in summer, crisp in autumn and dry and cold (with little snow) in winter.

Economy

A large part of the city's economy revolves around petroleum and the nearby Shengli Oil Field.

Industries include petroleum, petrochemistry, saline chemistry, papermaking, machinery, electronics, construction, building materials, foodstuff processing, pneumatic tires and rubber, textiles, and light industries.

Dongying is one of the world's leading producers of rubber tires. It has more tire factories than any other city in the world.

Recently, Dongying's economy has grown significantly, reflecting the high development of China's economy. The city's growing manufacturing sector and its proximity to oil reserves have led to increased company investments. An example is DuPont, which invested five billion yuan in 2005 to build a titanium dioxide factory in the area. After this project's completion, it became the largest investment outside of the US for DuPont.

Transportation
 Zibo–Dongying railway (Dongying railway station)
Dezhou–Dajiawa railway (passenger service available at Dongying South railway station)
Dongying Port railway (freight only)
 Dongying Shengli Airport

A new bus station was built between the east and west sides of the city, on Huanghe Road. Connections to Beijing, Qingdao and Jinan, among many other cities are available on a daily basis.

Education

Dongying is home to one major university, the China University of Petroleum, as well as several colleges and technical schools.
There are also many top high schools located in Dongying, one of those is Shengli Oilfield No.1 Middle School. Founded in 1965, rated as the most successful middle and high schools in China in a research hold by Beijing University in 2014, it is the first provincial standardized school in Shandong Province. There are 114 classes in the school with more than 5,300 students.

Explosion

There was an explosion that occurred at a chemical factory starting on Monday, 31 August 2015. Thirteen people died and several were detained by authorities.

Sister city

 Midland, Texas, United States, known for producing oil
 Samcheok, Gangwon-do, South Korea
 Madisonville, Kentucky, United States

References

External links

Government website of Dongying (in Simplified Chinese)
Profile of Dongying from WECP
Map of Dongying

 
Cities in Shandong
Prefecture-level divisions of Shandong
Port cities and towns in China